2022 Emmy Awards may refer to:

 43rd Sports Emmy Awards, held on May 24, 2022, honoring sports programming.
 49th Daytime Emmy Awards, held June 24, 2022, honoring daytime programming.
 49th Daytime Creative Arts & Lifestyle Emmy Awards, the separate Daytime Emmys ceremony held on June 18, 2022, to honor artistic and technical achievements in daytime programming.
 74th Primetime Emmy Awards, held on September 12, 2022, honoring primetime programming.
 74th Primetime Creative Arts Emmy Awards, the separate Primetime Emmys ceremony held on September 3–4, 2022, to honor artistic and technical achievements in primetime programming.
 43rd News and Documentary Emmy Awards, held on September 28–29, 2022, honoring news and documentary programming.
 50th International Emmy Awards, held on November 21, 2022, honoring international programming.
 1st Children's and Family Emmy Awards, held on December 10–11, 2022, honoring children's and family-oriented programming

Emmy Award ceremonies by year